Black Lizard may refer to:
 The Black Lizard, a 1934 novel by Edogawa Ranpo
 Black Lizard, a 1961 play by Yukio Mishima adapted from Ranpo's novel
 Black Lizard, a 1962 film directed by Umetsugu Inoue adapted from Ranpo's novel
 Black Lizard (film), a 1968 film directed by Kinji Fukasaku based on Mishima's adaptation
 Black Lizard (publisher), an American book publisher
 Black lizardfish, Bathysauropsis gracilis, a grinner of the genus Bathysauropsis